The electoral division of Mersey is one of the fifteen constituencies in the Tasmanian Legislative Council. The division covers an area of 732 km2.

In January 2019, the division had 27,668 enrolled voters.

Mersey is named after the Mersey River that flows through Devonport.

The electorate of Mersey includes part of Latrobe and the city of Devonport, the localities of Spreyton, Turners Beach and Forth.

Its current member of parliament is independent Mike Gaffney, elected in 2009.

Members

See also

 Tasmanian House of Assembly

References

External links
Parliament of Tasmania
Tasmanian Electoral Commission - Legislative Council

Mersey
Northern Tasmania